Başkənd may refer to:
Artsvashen, Armenia (a.k.a. Başkənd in Azerbaijani)
Başkənd, Kalbajar, Azerbaijan
Başkənd, Khojali, Azerbaijan
Başkənd, Nakhchivan, Azerbaijan

See also
Bashkend (disambiguation)
Başköy (disambiguation)